William L. Bliss (December 13, 1876 – January 29, 1969) was a justice of the Iowa Supreme Court from September 27, 1932, to December 5, 1932, and again from January 1, 1939, to April 16, 1962, appointed from Cerro Gordo County, Iowa.

References

Justices of the Iowa Supreme Court
People from Cerro Gordo County, Iowa
1876 births
1969 deaths